He Junke (born February 1969) is a Chinese executive and politician, currently serving as first secretary of the Secretariat of the Central Committee of the Communist Youth League of China and director of the National Working Committee of the Young Pioneers of China.

He was a representative of the 19th National Congress of the Chinese Communist Party and was an alternate member of the 19th Central Committee of the Chinese Communist Party. He is a representative of the 20th National Congress of the Chinese Communist Party and a member of the 20th Central Committee of the Chinese Communist Party.

Early life and education
He was born in Fengxiang County (now Fengxiang District), Shaanxi, in February 1969. In 1987, he entered National University of Defense Technology, where he majored in liquid rocket engine. He also received a master of engineering degree from Beihang University in December 2003.

Enterprise career
After university in 1991, He was assigned to the Ministry of Aerospace Industry, which was reshuffled as China Aerospace Industry Corporation in 1996. He joined the Chinese Communist Party (CCP) in June 1995.

In June 2000, he became assistant to the president of the 6th Research Institute of China Aerospace Mechanical and Electrical Corporation, rising to president two years later.

Political career
In December 2005, He was appointed secretary of the Secretariat of the Central Committee of the Communist Youth League of China, in addition to serving as vice president of the All-China Youth Federation. He was promoted to become executive secretary of the Secretariat of the Central Committee of the Communist Youth League of China in June 2013 and president of the All-China Youth Federation in September 2013. He was promoted again to first secretary of the Secretariat of the Central Committee of the Communist Youth League of China in June 2018, concurrently serving as director of the National Working Committee of the Young Pioneers of China.

References

1969 births
Living people
People from Baoji
National University of Defense Technology alumni
Beihang University alumni
People's Republic of China politicians from Shaanxi
Chinese Communist Party politicians from Shaanxi
Alternate members of the 19th Central Committee of the Chinese Communist Party
Members of the 20th Central Committee of the Chinese Communist Party